3x3 basketball was among the sports contested at the 2022 Commonwealth Games, held in Birmingham, England. This variation of basketball and its wheelchair counterpart was staged at the Games for the first time. All four tournaments took place between 29 July and 2 August 2022.

The discipline of wheelchair basketball made its sport debut at the Commonwealth Games.

Schedule
The competition schedule was as follows:

The wheelchair groups were drawn in May 2022; The running groups were drawn at a later date, August 2 Birmingham Time.

Venue
The competitions were held in a temporary Games-time venue at the brownfield site in Smithfield, named after the market that once stood in its place.

The venue also played host to beach volleyball and the start of the marathon; After the Games, it will be dismantled and the site is subject to a redevelopment scheme.

Medal summary

Medal table

Medallists

Qualification

Summary

3x3 basketball
Eight nations qualify for each tournament at the 2022 Commonwealth Games:
 The host nation.
 The top nation in the FIBA 3x3 Federation Rankings from each of the six CGF regions.
 The highest-ranked nation not already qualified.

Men

Women

;Notes

3x3 wheelchair basketball
Six nations qualify for each tournament at the 2022 Commonwealth Games:
 The host nation.
 The winners of the four IWBF Zonal Qualifiers.
 One nation not already qualified will receive a CGF/IWBF Bipartite Invitation.

Men

Women

;Qualifier scheduling issue

References

External links
 Official website: 2022 Commonwealth Games – 3x3 Basketball
 Official website: 2022 Commonwealth Games – 3x3 Wheelchair Basketball

 
2022 Commonwealth Games events
2022
Commonwealth Games
International basketball competitions hosted by England
Parasports competitions